Três Lagoas ("Three Ponds") is a municipality in Mato Grosso do Sul, Brazil. It is the third most populous city in that state. Founded in 1915, colonization began in 1880 by Luís Correia Neves Filho, Antônio Trajano dos Santos e Protásio Garcia Leal. It is named for three lakes in the region.

The city itself has a population of 123,281 according to 2020 estimates. The city has a reasonable income distribution and does not have pockets of poverty.

Culturally different, very close to southern cultures, such as Gaucho and Catarinense. Large festivals are held here as well as rodeos.

The city is served by Plínio Alarcom Airport.

Demographics

See also 
 Roman Catholic Diocese of Três Lagoas
 José Luiz Barbosa

References

Municipalities in Mato Grosso do Sul